The Micro Flying Robot (µFR) is the world’s smallest and lightest robot helicopter prototype, which was developed by Epson and demonstrated at the International Robot Exhibition in Tokyo in November 2003. The purpose of its development was to demonstrate its micro-mechatronics technology and to explore the possible use of micro robots and the development of component technology applications.

Features and capabilities
The µFR is levitated by contra-rotating propellers powered by four 7x2x1-mm ultrasonic motors (originally developed for wristwatches) and is balanced in mid-air by means of a stabilizing mechanism that uses a linear actuator. Though the µFR is radio-controlled, it relies on power from an external battery via a power cable and thus its flying range is limited. The µFR includes two microprocessors, a bluetooth module, a gyro-sensor, an accelerometer and an image sensor.

Development of µFR-II
The µFR-II is the enhanced version of the µFR. It was developed in 2004 for full wireless operation paired with independent flight capability. The main challenge was the need to combine lighter weight with greater dynamic lift. Epson made the robot lighter by developing a new gyro-sensor that is one-fifth the weight of its predecessor. Dynamic lift was boosted 30% by the introduction of more powerful ultra-thin ultrasonic motors and newly designed, optimally shaped main rotors. The µFR-II includes two 32-bit RISC microcontrollers, an on-board lithium polymer battery, as well as an image sensor that can capture and transmit images via Bluetooth wireless connection. At the moment it has a flight time of just 3 minutes.

Specifications

Possible applications
Security and surveillance
Disaster rescue
Space exploration

References

External links 
 µFR Epson News Release in November 2003 (archived)
 µFR-II Epson News Release in August 2004 (archived)
 Micro Flying Robotics in Space Missions
 BBC News article on the µFR-II

Miniature helicopters
Unmanned aerial vehicles of Japan
Robotics at Epson
2003 robots
Aerobots